The Treaty of London (also known as the Second Treaty of London) was proposed by England, accepted by France, and signed in 1359. After Edward the Black Prince soundly defeated the French at Poitiers (during the Hundred Years' War), where they captured John II of France, the French king was forced to accept the terms of the English. Based on the terms of the accord, England was permitted to annex much of western France, including Normandy, Anjou, Maine, Aquitaine within its ancient limits, Calais and Ponthieu, as well as suzerainty over the Duchy of Brittany. This would restore the ancient territories of Henry II, and in full sovereignty rather than as a fief. In addition, France would pay a ransom of four million écus for the king.

However, the treaty was later repudiated on 25 May by the French Estates-General, which felt that too much territory was being relinquished. This resulted in a fresh English invasion by Edward III, marching from Calais in November 1359. While the French were unwilling to meet Edward in battle, his sieges of Reims and Paris were unsuccessful, and the weak situation of his army led him to reopen negotiations. The English were forced to accept revised terms more favourable to the French and ultimately received Aquitaine and Calais, without Normandy or Brittany, and a reduced ransom in the Treaty of Brétigny.

References

See also
The First Treaty of London
Hundred Years' War
List of treaties

1359 in England
14th century in London
1350s in France
London (1359)
London
London (1359)
London
London (1359)
Edward III of England
Edward the Black Prince
Hundred Years' War, 1337–1360